Beth Hirsch, born October 18, 1967, is a singer-songwriter from Tampa, Florida. Hirsch is best known for her collaboration with Air on their album Moon Safari.  Her first solo album, Early Days, was released in 2000, followed by Titles & Idols in 2001. After a series of collaborations with artists including Pale 3, Jakatta, and D*Note, Hirsch released her third solo album Wholehearted, in 2007.
In June 2020, Hirsch announced the release of her new album, L.I.F.E., released October 26, 2020. Her current EP is entitled, After L.I.F.E., and was released on December 13, 2021.

Career
Hirsch was raised in Tampa, Florida to a Jewish family. In 1992, she moved to Boston where she continued her theater career. She moved on to Paris where she began her recording career with  the EP Miner's Son, released in 1998. The EP was heard by Hirsch's neighbor, Nicolas Godin, and his musical partner in Air, Jean Benoit Dunkel, with whom she collaborated on their Moon Safari album, co-writing and providing vocals on "All I Need" and "You Make It Easy". She toured with Air throughout Europe and the US before settling in London. Her second EP, P-Town Rubies, was released in 1999 on British independent label Dorado, which was followed by a UK tour with Terry Callier. Her collaboration with Wasis Diop, "Everything (Is Never Quite Enough)", from his Toxu album, appeared on the soundtrack of the remade The Thomas Crown Affair.

Hirsch's debut solo album, Early Days, was released in August 2000, with "Life Is Mine" taken from it as a single. The album received a three-star review from Allmusic.

Her second album, the Black Dog (Ken Downie) and Custom Blue-produced Titles & Idols, was released in 2001 to generally positive reviews."Titles & Idols Review", AllMusic.
 
Her third album, the self-released  Wholehearted (2007), received a four-star review from AllMusic.

Her current EP, After L.I.F.E. received this review from Australian film director and Music Supervisor, Andrew Kotatko:

"Beth Hirsch is a singer, songwriter and prolific collaborator with an exquisite voice as tender and caressing as a summer breeze in a sycamore tree. Beth’s captivating new EP “After L.I.F.E.” is a worthy companion piece to her excellent 2020 album “L.I.F.E.” Highlights include a gorgeously bittersweet reworking of “Our Song” by Takashi Fujimori (from Beth’s exceptional solo album “Wholehearted”), the summery, jazz-infused flight of “D*Votion” with D*Note, and Wouds' persuasive and driving new take (feat. ELIOT) on “All I Need”, Beth’s iconic collaboration with Air.”

Andrew Kotatko, Music Supervisor “The Power of the Dog”

Discography

Albums
 Early Days (2000, !K7)
 Titles & Idols (2001, !K7)
 Wholehearted (2007, Electric Bee)
 Love Is For Everyone L.I.F.E 2.0 (2020, Last Man Music)

Singles and EPs
 "Miner's Son" (1998, Artefact)
 P-Town Rubies EP (1999, Dorado)
 "Life Is Mine" (2000, !K7)
 "Nest Sensation" (2001, !K7)
 "Indelibly You" (2008, Electric Bee)
 "Something to Tell"/"So Many Things" (2010, Ho-Hum)
 "Confusion" (2012, Venus Recordings) (as AlfaBeth)
 "Let Him Go And Go To God" (2014, Venus Recordings) (as AlfaBeth)
 "Love Is For Everyone" (2014, Self-Raising Records)
 "Summer" (2015, Venus Recording) (as AlfaBeth)
 "Allison Something" (2020, Last Man Music)
 After L.I.F.E. EP (2021, Last Man Music)

Collaborations
 D*Note - D*Note (1997).
 Wasis Diop - Toxu (1998). Vocals on "Everything (...Is Never Quite Enough)"
 Air - Moon Safari (1998). Vocals on "All I Need", "You Make It Easy".
 Marc Collin - Les Kidnappeurs soundtrack (1998). Vocals on "Main Theme".
 Pale 3 - The Princess and the Warrior soundtrack (2000). Vocals on "The Tunnel".
 Fred Avril - "That Horse Must Be Starving" (2002). Vocals on "Helium Life Boat".
 Jakatta - Visions (2002). Vocals on "One Fine Day", "Home Away from You".
 Pale 3 - Crash (Music from and Inspired by the Film) (2005). Vocals on "Arrival".
 D*Note - Laguna (2006). Vocals on "Everybody Loves the Sunshine", "Wichita Lineman", "At Last I'm Free", "How Long", "Guinevere", "Edit and the Kingpin", "Then Along Came You", and "Being Alive".
 Various Artists - Café del Mar, vol.15 (2008). Vocals on "Under My Star", with Gelka.
 Billy Rivera - "21 Grief Street" (2011). Vocals on "Cold Corner".
 Rosita Kess - Northern Sky (2011). Vocals on "Northern Sky".
 Karmacoda - Eternal (2011). Vocals on "Love Will Turn Your Head Around".
 Solar Bears - Supermigration (2013). Vocals on "Our Future Is Underground".
 Bright Light Bright Light - "Make Me Believe In Hope (Blueprints Version)" (2013). Vocals on "Grace".
 The Willow - "In The Meanwhile" (2013). Vocals on "So Many Things".
 Karmacoda - "Love And Fate" (2015). Vocals on "All For Love", "We Don't Have A Lot Of Time" and "Message".
 Cross & Quinn - "Cold Sky Blue" (2016). Vocals on "Cold Sky Blue".
 Sanxero - "Right Where You Are" (2016)(single). Vocals.
 Sleep Party People - "Lingering" (2017). Vocals on "We Are There Together".
 Lauren Canyon - "Lauren Canyon" (2017). Vocals on "Prom Queen".
 Grey Tropical - "Path Of Magic" (2017)(single). Vocals.
 Sanxero - "A Getaway" (2018)(single). Vocals.
 Eliot - "Let The Sun Rise" (2018)(single). Vocals.
 Session Victim - "Needledrop" (2020). Vocals on "Made Me Fly".

References

External links

Discogs page
Talent profile of Beth Hirsch on SlateCast.com
March 2010 Beth Hirsch interview

1967 births
Living people
Musicians from Tampa, Florida
Writers from Tampa, Florida
21st-century American women singers
21st-century American singers